The Serranidae are a large family of fishes belonging to the order Perciformes. The family contains about 450 species in 65 genera, including the sea basses and the groupers (subfamily Epinephelinae). Representatives of this group live in tropical and subtropical seas worldwide.

Characteristics

Many serranid species are brightly colored, and many of the larger species are caught commercially for food. They are usually found over reefs, in tropical to subtropical waters along the coasts. Serranids are generally robust in form, with large mouths and small spines on the gill coverings. They typically have several rows of sharp teeth, usually with a pair of particularly large, canine-like teeth projecting from the lower jaw.

All serranids are carnivorous. Although some species, especially in the Anthiadinae subfamily, only feed on zooplankton, the majority feed on fish and crustaceans. They are typically ambush predators, hiding in cover on the reef and darting out to grab passing prey. Their bright colours are most likely a form of disruptive camouflage, similar to the stripes of a tiger.

Many species are protogynous hermaphrodites, meaning they start out as females and change sex to male later in life. They produce large quantities of eggs and their larvae are planktonic, generally at the mercy of ocean currents until they are ready to settle into adult populations.

Like other fish, serranids harbour parasites, including nematodes, cestodes, digeneans, monogeneans, isopods, and copepods. A study conducted in New Caledonia has shown that coral reef-associated serranids harbour about 10 species of parasites per fish species.

Classification

In recent times, this family has been proposed to be split. The two hypothetical families emerging from the remains of the possibly-obsolete taxon are the families Epinephilidae and Anthiadidae. This taxonomic separation is recognized by some authorities, including the IUCN.
Recent molecular classifications challenge the validity of the genera Cromileptes (sometimes spelled Chromileptes) and Anyperodon. Each of these two genera has a single species, which were included in the same clade as species of Epinephelus in a study based on five different genes.

The subfamilies and genera are as follows:

Notes

References
 
 

 
Marine fish families
Taxa named by William John Swainson